Oxycilla is a genus of moths in the family Erebidae. The genus was erected by Augustus Radcliffe Grote in 1896.

Species
 Oxycilla basipallida Barnes & McDunnough, 1916
 Oxycilla malaca Grote, 1873 – bent-lined tan moth
 Oxycilla mitographa Grote, 1873
 Oxycilla ondo Barnes, 1907
 Oxycilla tripla Grote, 1896

References

Rivulinae
Moth genera